Marqués is a Spanish language surname, meaning Marquis.

Marquès is a Catalan language surname, meaning Marquis.

People
Aina Moll Marquès (1930-2019), Spanish philologist and politician
Fernando Marqués (born 1984), Spanish footballer
Francisco Domingo Marqués (1842–1920), Spanish painter
Miguel Marqués (1843–1918), Spanish composer and violinist
Nemesi Marquès Oste (born 1935), Andorran priest
René Marqués (1919–1979), Puerto Rican short story writer and playwright

Places
Viso del Marqués, a municipality in Ciudad Real, Spain
Cerro La Cruz del Marqués,  peak of the Ajusco Mountain Range in Mexico
El Marqués, a municipality in Mexico

References

Spanish-language surnames
Catalan-language surnames